Hermann Mendel (6 August 1834 – 26 October 1876) was a German musicologist.

He founded the Musikalisches Conversations-Lexikon, which was published in Berlin from 1870 on and was further edited by August Reissmann (1825-1903) after Mendel's death. His Taschenliederbuch with texts of more than 500 German songs reached countless editions.

Mendel died probably in Berlin at the age of 42.

Work 
 Otto Nicolai. Eine Biographie, Berlin: Hermann Mendel 1866 (Numerized) – 2nd edition Berlin: Ludwig Heimann 1868 (Numerized)
 Giacomo Meyerbeer. Eine Biographie, Berlin: Ludwig Heimann 1868 (Numerized)
 Deutsches Taschen-Liederbuch; Mode, Berlin 1917, 93. Aufl.
Founded by Hermann Mendel, continued by August Reissmann:
 Musikalisches Conversations-Lexikon, Vol. 1, edited by Hermann Mendel, Berlin: Ludwig Heimann 1870, (Numerized) – 2. Ausg. 1880
 Musikalisches Conversations-Lexikon; Vol. 2. Oppenheim, Berlin 1872, 2. Ausg. 1880
 Musikalisches Conversations-Lexikon; Vol. 3. Oppenheim, Berlin 1873, 2. Ausg. 1880
 Musikalisches Conversations-Lexikon, Vol. 4, edited by Hermann Mendel, Berlin: Robert Oppenheim 1874 (Numerizedt) – 2. Ausg. 1880
 Musikalisches Conversations-Lexikon; Vol. 5. Oppenheim, Berlin 1875, 2. Ausg. 1880
 Musikalisches Conversations-Lexikon; Vol. 6. Oppenheim, Berlin 1876, 2. Ausg. 1881
 Musikalisches Conversations-Lexikon; Vol. 7. Oppenheim, Berlin 1877, 2. Ausg. 1881
 Musikalisches Conversations-Lexikon; Vol. 8. Oppenheim, Berlin 1877, 2. Ausg. 1882
 Musikalisches Conversations-Lexikon; Vol. 9. Oppenheim, Berlin 1878, 2. Ausg. 1882
 Musikalisches Conversations-Lexikon, Vol. 10, founded by Mendel, continued by Reissmann, Berlin: Robert Oppenheim 1878 (Numerized) – 2. Ausg. 1886
 Musikalisches Conversations-Lexikon; Vol. 11. Oppenheim, Berlin 1879, 2. Ausg. 1887
 Musikalisches Conversations-Lexikon; Erg.-Bd. Oppenheim, Berlin 1883

Further reading 
 
 Daniel Patrick Balestrini: Hermann Mendel und Gustav Modes Operntextbibliothek. Zur Popularisierung der Oper im Industriezeitalter. Are, Mainz 2009, .

References

External links 
 
 
 Musiklexika bei Wikisource

19th-century German musicologists
1834 births
1876 deaths
Halle